Dança dos Famosos 2020 was the seventeenth season of the Brazilian reality television show Dança dos Famosos which premiered on September 13, 2020, with the competitive live shows beginning on the following week on September 20, 2020, at 7:00 / 6:00 p.m. (BRT / AMT) on Rede Globo. Due to the COVID-19 pandemic, it has been confirmed that the season would be slightly shorter than planned.

Couples
The first celebrities (Bruno, Danielle, Giullia, Henri, Isabelli and Zé Roberto) were announced on August 30. On September 6, the final celebrities (André, Felipe, Guta, Lucy, Luiza and Marcelo) were also revealed. The full lineup of professionals and couples were unveiled on September 13. It was also announced that Henri Castelli had withdrawn from competing due to undisclosed reasons. On September 20, Juliano Laham was revealed as his replacement.

Elimination chart

Key
 
 
  Eliminated
  Saved last
  Withdrew
  Third place
  Runner-up
  Winner

Weekly results

Week 1 

 Presentation of the Celebrities

Aired: September 13, 2020

Week 2 
Week 1 – Women
Style: Disco
Aired: September 20, 2020

Week 3 
Week 1 – Men
Style: Disco
Aired: September 27, 2020

Week 4 
Week 2 – Women
Style: Forró
Aired: October 4, 2020

Week 5 
Week 2 – Men
Style: Forró
Aired: October 11, 2020

Week 6 
Week 3 – Women
Style: Funk
Aired: October 18, 2020

Week 7 
Week 3 – Men
Style: Funk
Aired: October 25, 2020

Week 8 
Week 4 – Women
Style: Rock
Aired: November 1, 2020

Week 
Week 4 – Men
Style: Rock
Aired: November 8, 2020

Week 10 
Group 1
Style: Foxtrot
Aired: November 22, 2020

Running order

Week 11 
Group 2
Style: Foxtrot
Aired: November 29, 2020

Running order

Week 12 
Week 1 – Semifinals
Style: Samba
Aired: December 6, 2020

Running order

Week 13 
Week 2 – Semifinals
Style: Samba
Aired: December 13, 2020

Running order

Week 14 
Top 3 – Finals
Styles: Waltz & Tango
Aired: December 20, 2020

Running order

References

External links
 

2020 Brazilian television seasons
Season 17
Television series impacted by the COVID-19 pandemic